Empire is an unincorporated community in Chicot County, Arkansas, United States.
Empire is located just west of Ross Van Ness, see Ross Van Ness for additional information regarding the Empire community.

References

Unincorporated communities in Chicot County, Arkansas
Unincorporated communities in Arkansas